Better Start Running is a 2018 American comedy drama film directed by Brett Simon and starring Alex Sharp, Analeigh Tipton, Edi Gathegi, Karan Soni, Maria Bello, Kris Jerome Flowers and Jeremy Irons.

Cast
Analeigh Tipton as Stephanie Peterson
Alex Sharp as Harley Johnson
Jeremy Irons as Garrison Curtis
Edi Gathegi as Fitz Paradise
Maria Bello as Agent McFadden
Karan Soni as Agent Nelson Husseini
Chad Faust as Dale Hankey
Jane Seymour as Mary Linson

Reception
The film has  rating on Rotten Tomatoes.

References

External links
 
 

2018 films
2018 action comedy films
American action comedy films
2010s English-language films
2010s American films